In mathematics,  regular surface may refer to:

Regular surface (differential geometry)
Non-singular algebraic variety of dimension two